Oksana Ivanivna Zholnovych (born 1979) is a Ukrainian stateswoman and politician. On 19 July 2022, she was appointed as the Minister of Social Policy of Ukraine.

Biography 
In 2001, she graduated from University of Lviv. Holds the title of PhD in Law.

From 2019 to 2020, she was an adviser to the Minister of Social Policy of Ukraine in the field of protection of persons with disabilities.

From 2020 to 2022, she was the head of the Department of Social Policy and Health Care of the Office of the President of Ukraine.

On July 19, 2022, the Verkhovna Rada of Ukraine appointed Oksana Zholnovych as Minister of Social Policy of Ukraine. This decision was supported by 282 deputies.

See also 
 Shmyhal Government

References

External links 

 Ministry of Social Policy (in Ukrainian)

1979 births
Living people
University of Lviv alumni
Labor and social policy ministers of Ukraine
Independent politicians in Ukraine
Women government ministers of Ukraine
21st-century Ukrainian women politicians
21st-century Ukrainian politicians
Eastern Orthodox Christians from Ukraine